Curtis Jones may refer to:

 Curtis Jones (pianist) (1906–1971), American blues pianist
 Curtis Jones (singer) or Green Velvet (born 1968), American singer, record producer, and DJ
 Curtis Jones (minister) (born 1986), American minister convicted of murder as a minor
 Curtis Jones (footballer) (born 2001), English footballer
Curtis J. Jones Jr., American politician

See also
Curt Jones (disambiguation)